The 1982 World Taekwondo Championships are the 5th edition of the World Taekwondo Championships, and were held in Guayaquil, Ecuador from February 24 to February 27, 1982. A total of 229 athletes from 35 nations took part in the championships.

Medal summary

Medal table

References

WTF Medal Winners

External links
WT Official Website

World Championships
World Taekwondo Championships
World Taekwondo Championships
Taekwondo Championships
Taekwondo in Ecuador